Roy Lee Hilton (March 23, 1943 – January 6, 2019) was an American football defensive end in the National Football League from 1965 through 1975.

Early life 
During that span he appeared in Super Bowl III and Super Bowl V for the Baltimore Colts. He played college football at Jackson State University. Hilton died in 2019 at the age of 75; he had dementia in his later years.

References

1943 births
2019 deaths
People from Hazlehurst, Mississippi
Players of American football from Mississippi
American football defensive ends
Jackson State Tigers football players
Baltimore Colts players
New York Giants players
Atlanta Falcons players